Blue Oval may refer to:

 Ford Motor Company (nicknamed "Blue Oval"), a U.S. car company
 Blue Oval logo, the logo of the Ford Motor Company
 Blue Oval City, Stanton, Tennessee, USA; a Ford Motor Company car factory 
 Blue Oval News, an independent automotive news website, predecessor of Blue Oval Forums

See also
 Steel Blue Oval, Bassendean, Western Australia, Australia; a sports stadium